Mashkovo is a rural locality (a village) in Slednevskoye Rural Settlement, Alexandrovsky District, Vladimir Oblast, Russia. The population was 36 as of 2010. There are 7 streets.

Geography 
Mashkovo is located 6 km west of Alexandrov (the district's administrative centre) by road. Naumovo is the nearest rural locality.

References 

Rural localities in Alexandrovsky District, Vladimir Oblast